Jimmy Florian (September 25, 1923February 14, 1999) was an American stock car racing driver. Nicknamed "Shirtless", he attained the moniker after winning his first and only NASCAR Grand National Series race in 1950 at Dayton Speedway; upon entering Victory Lane, he exited the car without wearing a shirt. The victory was also the first for Ford Motor Company in NASCAR's top series.

Racing career
Florian started racing quarter midgets and sprint cars around his hometown of Cleveland. At one track, Florian won 71 of 75 feature races.

In 1950, he started competing in the NASCAR Grand National Series, driving a 1950 Ford that was formerly owned by the Detroit chief of police. His friend, truck driver Bill Whitley, co-owned the car and drove some races in the Ford, a Hudson Hornet and an Oldsmobile. In addition to driving, Florian served as a mechanic. He made his debut at Langhorne Speedway and finished third. Two races later, he won the pole position at Canfield Speedway (he finished sixth). At Dayton Speedway, Florian passed the dominant car of Curtis Turner (who led 115 of 200 laps) with 35 laps remaining to win the first NASCAR Grand National Series race for Ford Motor Company. Incredulous with the result (especially as Florian's flathead engine Ford was able to defeat the overhead valve engines of the successful Oldsmobiles), drivers like Turner, Joe Weatherly and Lee Petty protested the finish. During a post-race inspection, NASCAR went as far as to contact the Ford Motor Company to ensure Florian's engine was not oversized, though the company responded that the car was legal. In Victory Lane, Florian exited the car shirtless; Whitley stated the heat that day, the discomfort of the car's seat, the lack of a seatbelt (which were not required by NASCAR at the time) and the amount of protection a stock car offered contributed to Florian's decision to take off his shirt. NASCAR eventually created a rule prohibiting drivers from removing their shirts.

He ended the 1950 season with a ninth-place finish in the championship. Florian continued to race in NASCAR in 1951 (including three races for Don Rogala), 1952 and 1954; though he did not win another race, he recorded seven top-ten finishes and two top-fives.

After his NASCAR career ended, Florian continued short track racing, competing in vintage cars until he was 72. He died in February 1999 at the age of 75 after a battle with cancer.

Motorsports career results

NASCAR
(key) (Bold – Pole position awarded by qualifying time. Italics – Pole position earned by points standings or practice time. * – Most laps led.)

Grand National Series

References

External links
 

1923 births
1999 deaths
Sportspeople from Cleveland
Racing drivers from Ohio
NASCAR drivers